The oxygen-evolving complex (OEC), also known as the water-splitting complex, is the portion of photosystem II where photo-oxidation of water occurs during the light reactions of photosynthesis. The OEC is surrounded by four core protein subunits of photosystem II at the membrane-lumen interface.

In the overall water oxidation reaction, four electrons are extracted from two water molecules so that four protons and one O2 molecule are produced. The molecular machinery for oxidizing water requires the ability to store the oxidizing potential resulting from three light-induced charge separations before the fourth provides sufficient oxidizing power for water oxidation.

Species distribution and subcellular location 
The OEC and Photosystem II are only found in chloroplasts and cyanobacteria. Within the chloroplasts, Photosystem II spans the thylakoid membrane, composed of both granal thylakoids and stromal thylakoids.

Structure 

The OEC has a metalloenzyme core containing both manganese and calcium, with the empirical formula in the S1 state for the inorganic core of Mn4O5Ca. This cluster is coordinated by amino acid side chains of the D1 and CP43 subunits and is stabilized by peripheral membrane proteins. These peripheral membrane proteins include OEE1 (PsbO), OEE2 (PsbP) and OEE3 (PsbQ); a fourth PsbR peptide is associated nearby. For other characteristics, see.

The Mn4O5Ca cluster is assembled within the Photosystem II protein in a light-driven process called photoactivation. Mn2+ ions diffuse into the active site and are oxidized there by the same components responsible for water oxidation: the redox-active tyrosine of D1, which is oxidized by light-generated P680+. The oxo bridges of the cluster derive from water molecules bound to the metal ions. The quantum efficiency of photoactivation is low. The process is not well understood.

Mechanism 

The OEC transfers four electrons, one at a time, to P680+. A tyrosine residue of the D1 polypeptide, YZ, is the immediate electron donor to P680+. According to the model proposed in 1970 by Bessel Kok, the complex can exist in five states: S0 to S4, S0 being the least oxidized and S4 the most oxidized. Photons absorbed by photosystem II move the system in four steps from state S0 to S4. S4 is unstable and it releases molecular oxygen. For the complex to reset to the lowest state, S0, it binds two new water molecules to enable the cycle to repeat.

Currently, although the mechanism of water oxidation by the complex is not completely understood, the main features of the mechanism have been uncovered. The roles of Cl− and the membrane proteins surrounding the metal cluster are not fully understood. Much of what is known has been deduced from flash experiments, EPR, and x-ray spectroscopy.

The Mn4O5Ca cluster is the most striking feature of the OEC. It is crucial because it stores the three oxidizing equivalents in going from S0 to S3, and it binds the two substrate water molecules in such proximity that the oxygen-oxygen bond can be formed and in such a way that the protons of the water molecules can be extracted. Because of its obvious importance, some authors use the term oxygen-evolving complex to refer to the Mn4O5Ca cluster.

The question of which manganese oxidation states are present in the cluster has been the subject of many investigations. This matter may have been decided by experiments that made use of the photoactivation process. Starting from Mn2+ ions, molecular oxygen was produced starting after nine flashes of light, which implies that in the S3 state all four manganese atoms have attained the Mn(IV) oxidation state. Working backward, S0 is Mn(III)3Mn(IV) and so on for the other S states.

Binding the substrate water molecules is a second function of the Mn4O5Ca cluster. In S1, the best characterized state of the cluster, it has five oxo bridges, and two water molecules are bound to each of Mn4 and the calcium atom.

Oxygen isotope exchange experiments showed that both substrate oxygen atoms are exchangeable and that one exchanges more readily than the other. It has been suggested that the more slowly exchanging oxygen atom is O5, which is a bridging ligand to Mn2, Mn3 and Ca. It binds already in S0, possibly as a hydroxo ligand.

The second substrate water molecule is bound in S2, likely to Mn4, which in S2 is five coordinate Mn(III). During the S2 to S3 transition, Mn4 becomes a six-coordinate Mn(IV) with a new water-derived ligand as the substrate oxygen atom moves to a position much nearer to O5.  These motions are described as a carousel mechanism  for delivery of the substrate water molecule into the position where it can be incorporated into the product. The crystal structure of S3 suggests that the two substrate oxygen atom nuclei are within 2 Å of each other. Close proximity of the two substrate oxygen atoms is essential for forming the O-O bond in the S3 to S4 to S0 transition.

In addition to the dioxygen product for which the OEC is named, the other products are four hydrogen ions. These are delivered to the enclosed interior of the thylakoid membrane where they contribute to the driving force for ADP → ATP phosphorylation. Several channels containing water molecules and hydrophilic amino acid site chains have been identified in the protein which may enable the protons to escape from the active site.

Research 

The details of how the substrate protons are separated from the substrate oxygens bound to the Mn4O5Ca cluster have not been established. One point of view holds that the protons are shed from the cluster in response to its oxidation by YZ• where this redox reaction is thought of as electron transfer from the cluster to YZ•. An alternative proposal is that the protons are given up by YZ as it is oxidized by P680+and that YZ• extracts both a proton and an electron from the cluster on each transition.  Because protons are so numerous in the samples and are not observable in crystal studies, this question may eventually be decided by computational methods.

Another question that may be decided by computational methods is the nature of oxygen-oxygen bond forming reaction. This question is of great interest because the reaction is unique in biology and because the answer may help in designing artificial catalysts for water splitting. From experimental work on the S3 to S4 to S0 transition, it is known that the time course of YZ• reduction roughly matches the time course of O2 release. This means that any potential intermediates in the process can have only very short lifetimes, making them undetectable.

Extensive computational investigations using density functional theory have been carried out to map out the entire S-state cycle and especially to probe the S3 to S0 transition; for example, see. Hybrid methods melding quantum mechanics with molecular mechanics calculations are also being used. The results of such efforts are not always in agreement. There is still much to be learned about the mechanism of photosynthetic water oxidation.

References

Further reading 

  - outlines a possible route for the evolution of the OEC.

Photosynthesis
Light reactions